This House Possessed is a 1981 American made-for-television horror film directed by William Wiard and starring Parker Stevenson and Lisa Eilbacher.

Plot
Following a nervous breakdown, a recuperating rock star and his young nurse discover the estate they've rented is harboring secrets that could be deadly.

Filming Location
Much of This House Possessed was shot in Rancho Santa Fe, California. The home is formally known as Del Dios Ranch. It was built in 1972 and designed by noted Laguna Beach architect Fred Briggs, while interior designer Arthur Elrod—famous for his Palm Springs aesthetic, magnified the mid-century look and feel inside the home's more than 8,000 square feet. It is located at 7010 El Camino Del Norte, Rancho Santa Fe, CA 92067. When the home was listed for sale in 2016, it was the most expensive private real estate listing in San Diego history.

Cast
 Parker Stevenson as Gary Straihorn
 Lisa Eilbacher as Sheila Moore
 Joan Bennett as Rag Lady
 Slim Pickens as Arthur Keene
 Shelley Smith as Tanya
 Bill Morey as Robbins
 Jan Shutan as Helen
 David Paymer as Pasternak
 Jack Garner as Feeney
 K Callan as Lucille
 Barry Corbin as Lieutenant Fletcher
 John Dukakis as Donny
 Amanda Wyss as Holly
 Ivy Bethune as Martha
 Philip Baker Hall as Clerk (as Phillip Baker Hall)

References

External links

Retrojunk

1981 television films
1981 horror films
1981 films
ABC network original films
American horror television films
American supernatural horror films
1980s supernatural horror films
Films scored by Billy Goldenberg
1980s psychological thriller films
American haunted house films
Films directed by William Wiard
1980s English-language films
1980s American films